Diego Gutiérrez (born ) is a former Argentine male volleyball player. He was part of the Argentina men's national volleyball team. He competed with the national team at the 2004 Summer Olympics in Athens, Greece. He played with Evivo Düren in 2004.

Clubs
   Evivo Düren (2004)

See also
 Argentina at the 2004 Summer Olympics

References

1976 births
Living people
Argentine men's volleyball players
Place of birth missing (living people)
Volleyball players at the 2004 Summer Olympics
Olympic volleyball players of Argentina